Alan Stewart (born 19 September 1955) is a British former alpine skier who competed in the 1976 Winter Olympics and in the 1980 Winter Olympics.

References

External links
 

1955 births
Living people
British male alpine skiers
Olympic alpine skiers of Great Britain
Alpine skiers at the 1976 Winter Olympics
Alpine skiers at the 1980 Winter Olympics